Topklasse (English: Top Class) may refer to:

 former name (2010 to 2016) of the Derde Divisie, fourth tier football league in the Netherlands
Topklasse (women), women's football league in the Netherlands
Topklasse (cricket), cricket competition in the Netherlands
SVB Topklasse, football leagues in Suriname